Roche is a surname of Norman origin. Notable people with this surname include:

The Roches, a female vocal group of sisters (Maggie and Terre and Suzzy Roche)
Roche baronets, baronetcy of Great Britain
Albert Severin Roche (1895–1939), French soldier
Alexander Roche, Baron Roche (1871–1956), British judge
Alexandra Roche, Lady Roche (born 1934), British philanthropist
Arthur Roche (born 1950), English Catholic bishop and cardinal
 Sir Boyle Roche, 1st Baronet, Irish politician and wit
Charlotte Roche (born 1978), German television presenter, actress, singer and author
Christine Roche (born 1939), French-Canadian illustrator, cartoonist, teacher and filmmaker
Collette Roche, a British businesswoman, chief operating officer at Manchester United Football Club
Daniel Roche (historian) (1935–2023), French social and cultural historian
Daniel Roche (born 1999), English child actor
Danni Roche (born 1970), Australian field hockey player
David Roche (disambiguation), multiple people
Des Roche, 1930s NHL hockey player
Dick Roche (born 1947), Irish politician
Douglas Roche (born 1929), peace activist and former Canadian Senator
Édouard Roche (1820–1883), French scientist
Eric Roche (1967–2005), Irish fingerstyle guitarist
Ernest Roche (1850–1917), French engraver and socialist politician. 
Eustachius Roche (fl. 1580–1600), Flemish mining engineer
France Roche (1921–2013), a French film actress and screenwriter
Frank Roche  (born 1959), American writer
Jake Roche (born 1992), English singer-songwriter and actor and lead vocalist of Rixton
James G. Roche (born 1939), 20th Secretary of the United States Air Force
John Roche (disambiguation), multiple people
Juliette Roche (1884–1980), French painter and writer
Karl Roche (1862–1931), German syndicalist
Kevin Roche (1922–2019), American architect
Michael Roche (disambiguation), multiple people
Mickaël Roche, Tahitian footballer
Nicolas Roche, Irish cyclist
Quincy Roche (born 1998), American football player
Raymond Roche, French motorcyclist
Regina Maria Roche, English novelist
Shane Roche, Gaelic footballer
Stephen Roche, Irish cyclist
Thomas C. Roche, American photographer
Tiger Roche, Irish soldier, adventurer and outlaw
Tony Roche (born 1945), Australian tennis player and coach
William Roche (rugby union), Irish rugby union player

French-language surnames
Anglicised Irish-language surnames